Fortera Stadium is a stadium located on the campus of Austin Peay State University in Clarksville, Tennessee. It opened in 1946 and is the home venue for the Austin Peay Governors football team.

History 
Clarksville Municipal Stadium, as it was originally known, was constructed by the city of Clarksville in 1946.  The city permitted Austin Peay to use the stadium for an annual sum which was thought to be the actual cost to the city.  The city maintained its ownership and operation of the Municipal Stadium until 1970. In that year, as a result of a cooperative agreement between Austin Peay, the county officials and the city officials, the city conveyed title to one-third of the stadium to the State of Tennessee for the university.  The other one-third went to Montgomery County. Following the 1993 season, the University agreed to purchase Municipal Stadium from the Stadium Authority and Montgomery County. With the purchase, the University installed a new playing surface and changed the name of the facility to Governors Stadium.

Austin Peay, Montgomery County, and the city of Clarksville were authorized to appropriate funds to the newly created Stadium Authority for constructing, remodeling and operating the stadium. The members of the Stadium Authority were to be appointed by the county and by the university.

In April 2016, Fortera Credit Union earned naming rights to Governors Stadium. On April 23, Governors Stadium was officially renamed as Fortera Stadium.

Renovations
Austin Peay agreed to purchase Municipal Stadium from the Stadium Authority.  As a result, Stadia Turf replaced the AstroTurf which had been placed by the Stadium Authority.  The playing surface was changed again in 2004 when Polytan surfaces were installed on the football field (Mega Grass) and track (Polytan WSS 15).

In August 2012, the Tennessee state government approved plans for a $16 million stadium renovation. After the 2013 season, the west (home) side of the stadium was demolished and replaced with a new structure that includes luxury boxes, a training facility, and new chairback seating. The field and the surrounding track were also be replaced; the east (visitor's) side remains largely intact. The renovated stadium reopened for the 2014 season. The renovation also replaced the west side grandstands with a new structure that includes state-of-the-art amenities for student-athletes, coaches and fans.

In April 2014 a small sinkhole opened up at a point between the football field and the track. On May 19, the school started repair work on the sinkhole, which necessitated digging a hole 40 feet (12 m) wide by 40 feet deep to find stable bedrock. School officials were quoted as saying that they expected repairs to solve the problem and that they had budgeted for sinkhole issues due to the karstic terrain on which the campus is situated.

In a separate project, the stadium's east grandstands, while not razed, were renovated to move the stadium's in-game operations into the press box. In addition, space under the grandstands was renovated for the university's track and field program.

The improvements at Fortera Stadium are not complete. Space exists within the facility for a new strength and conditioning facility as well as coaches' offices – each to be completed in the future.

Using the money donated by the Maynard family, a portion of the funds will be used to replace the field turf in the near future before the football team begins play in the upcoming 2022 Season.

Features
The first floor of the new facility includes the Bill Dupes Locker Room, the new home for the Governors football team. Football student-athletes also have access to new athletic training facilities and their gear is stowed in a new equipment room. In addition, fans can purchase their game day tickets at the football ticket offices with windows located in the center of the facility.

Fans are able to access the main grandstand from the second level. That area also includes new concession stands and is the home of the GovsGear.com store which provides fans the opportunity to purchase the latest in Austin Peay athletics apparel every game day.

The third and fourth levels provide club seating and 13 skyboxes, respectively. The skyboxes offer tiered stadium-type seating with up to 22 seats. The 8,000-square-foot Club Level seats 386 spectators and is designed to offer catered meals on football game days.

To the south of the new stadium facility is the Blake Jenkins Plaza, which provides an expansive concourse for fans to enter the facility. In addition, the Hendricks Fox Walk of History is located in this area and will feature the name of every football player to have donned the Governors uniform.

See also
 List of NCAA Division I FCS football stadiums

References

External links
 Fortera Stadium from Austin Peay Athletics

College football venues
Austin Peay Governors football
Buildings and structures in Clarksville, Tennessee
American football venues in Tennessee
Multi-purpose stadiums in the United States
Sports in Clarksville, Tennessee